Silver Haze is a 2017 album by Aye Nako.

Silver Haze may also refer to:

Silver Haze (film), a 2023 drama film
Silver Haze, a strain of cannabis
Silver Haze, a 1999 album by The Quill